The Sunshine Coast Stingrays is an Australian rugby union football team that represents Queensland's Sunshine Coast region. The Stingrays played in the Queensland Premier Rugby competition from 2005 to 2013, but now focus on competing in the Queensland Country Championships.

The Stingrays played in the Grand Final in their sixth season in the Premier Rugby competition
in 2010. However, after facing funding difficulties in 2013, the Sunshine Coast Rugby Union decided not to compete in the 2014 season.

Season results
Queensland Premier Rugby (2005–2013)

 2005 10th (5 competition points)
 2006 10th (12 competition points)
 2007 10th (16 competition points)
 2008 8th (25 competition points)
 2009 9th (20 competition points)
 2010 4th (52 competition points) - GRAND FINALIST
 2011 8th (25 competition points)
 2012 10th (5 competition points)
 2013 10th (6 competition points)

Queensland Country Championships (11 QCRU Sub-Unions)
 2010 Champion (undefeated)
 2004 Champion
 1998 Runner-up
 1997 Runner-up

Permiership finals results
Queensland Premier Rugby (2005–2013)
 Premiers (Hospital Challenge Cup)
 NIL
 Runners-up (Vince Nicholls Memorial Trophy)
 2010 Qld University 19-11 Sunshine Coast

Queensland Country Championships (1996–2010)
 Champions
 2010 Sunshine Coast 37–12 Gold Coast
 2004 Sunshine Coast def. Cairns
 Runners-up
 1997 Townsville 17–13 Sunshine Coast
 1996 Townsville 15–13 Sunshine Coast

Internationals
Internationals selected whilst playing for the Stingrays
 Will Genia

Internationals selected whilst playing for another Club
 Mike Hercus, U.S.A. (2009)
 Toutai Kefu, Australia. (2010)
 Morgan Turinui, Australia. (2010)
 Caleb Ralph, New Zealand. (2010)

See also

Rugby union in Queensland
Sunshine Coast Rugby Union

References

Sources
 

Sport in the Sunshine Coast, Queensland
Rugby union teams in Queensland
Rugby clubs established in 2005
2005 establishments in Australia